Alamo Airport may refer to:
 Alamo Landing Field in Alamo, Nevada, United States (FAA: L92)
 Alamo Navajo Airport in Alamo, New Mexico, United States (FAA: 3N9)
 McCarran International Airport in Clark County, Nevada, United States (FAA: LAS), was known as Alamo Airport from 1942 to 1948
 San Antonio International Airport in San Antonio, Texas, United States (FAA: SAT), was known as Alamo Field